Carole King Klein (born Carol Joan Klein; February 9, 1942) is an American singer, songwriter, and musician who has been active since 1958, initially as one of the staff songwriters at the Brill Building and later as a solo artist. Widely regarded as a highly significant and influential musician, King is the most successful female songwriter of the latter half of the 20th century in the US, having written or co-written 118 pop hits on the Billboard Hot 100. King also wrote 61 hits that charted in the UK, making her the most successful female songwriter on the UK singles charts between 1962 and 2005.

King's major success began in the 1960s when she and her first husband, Gerry Goffin, wrote more than two dozen chart hits, many of which have become standards, for numerous artists. She has continued writing for other artists since then. King's success as a performer in her own right did not come until the 1970s, when she sang her own songs, accompanying herself on the piano, in a series of albums and concerts. After experiencing commercial disappointment with her debut album Writer, King scored her breakthrough with the album Tapestry, which topped the U.S. album chart for 15 weeks in 1971 and remained on the charts for more than six years.

King has made 25 solo albums, the most successful being Tapestry, which held the record for most weeks at No. 1 by a female artist for more than 20 years. Her record sales were estimated at more than 75 million copies worldwide. She has won four Grammy Awards and was inducted into the Songwriters Hall of Fame.  She has been inducted twice into the Rock and Roll Hall of Fame, as a performer and songwriter. She is the recipient of the 2013 Library of Congress Gershwin Prize for Popular Song, the first woman to be so honored. She is also a 2015 Kennedy Center Honoree.

Early life and education
King was born Carol Joan Klein on February 9, 1942, in Manhattan, New York City, to Jewish parents Eugenia (née Cammer), a teacher, and Sidney N. Klein, a firefighter. King's parents met in an elevator in 1936 at Brooklyn College, where her father was a chemistry major and her mother was an English and drama major.

They married in 1937 during the last years of the Great Depression. King's mother dropped out of college to run the household; her father also quit college and briefly took a job as a radio announcer. With the economy struggling, he then took a more secure job as a firefighter. After King was born, her parents remained in Brooklyn and were eventually able to buy a small two-story duplex where they could rent out the upstairs for income.

King's mother had learned how to play piano as a child, and after buying a piano, would sometimes practice. When King developed an insatiable curiosity about music from the time she was about three, her mother began teaching her basic piano skills, without giving her actual lessons. When King was four, her parents discovered she had absolute pitch, which enabled her to name a note correctly just by hearing it. King's father enjoyed showing off his daughter's skill to visiting friends: "My dad's smile was so broad that it encompassed the lower half of his face. I enjoyed making my father happy and getting the notes right."

King's mother began giving her real music lessons when she was four with King climbing the stool, made higher still by a phone book. With her mother sitting beside her, King learned music theory and elementary piano technique, including how to read notation and execute proper note timing. King wanted to learn as much as possible: "My mother never forced me to practice. She didn't have to. I wanted so much to master the popular songs that poured out of the radio."

King began kindergarten when she was four, and after her first year she was promoted directly to second grade, showing an exceptional facility with words and numbers. In the 1950s, she went to James Madison High School. She formed a band called the Co-Sines, changed her name from Carol Klein to Carole King, and made demo records with her friend Paul Simon for $25 a session. Her first official recording was the promotional single "The Right Girl", released by ABC-Paramount in 1958, which she wrote and sang to an arrangement by Don Costa.

King attended Queens College, where she met Gerry Goffin, who was to become her songwriting partner. When she was 17, they married in a Jewish ceremony on Long Island in August 1959 after King became pregnant with her first daughter, Louise. They quit college and took day jobs, Goffin working as an assistant chemist and King as a secretary. They wrote songs together in the evening.

Neil Sedaka, who had dated King when he was still in high school, had a hit in 1959 with "Oh! Carol". Goffin took the tune and wrote the playful response, "Oh! Neil", which King recorded and released as a single the same year. The B-side contained the Goffin-King song "A Very Special Boy". The single was not a success. After writing the Shirelles' Billboard Hot 100 number 1 hit "Will You Love Me Tomorrow", by The Shirelles, the first No.1 hit by a black girl group, Goffin and King gave up their daytime jobs to concentrate on writing. "Will You Love Me Tomorrow" became a standard.

1960s
During the sixties, with King composing the music and Goffin writing the lyrics, the two wrote a string of classic songs for a variety of artists. King and Goffin were also the songwriting team behind Don Kirshner's Dimension Records, which produced songs including "Chains" (later recorded by the Beatles), "The Loco-Motion", "Keep Your Hands off My Baby" (both for their babysitter Little Eva), and "It Might as Well Rain Until September" which King recorded herself in 1962 — her first success, which charted at 22 in the US and 3 in the UK (where it was her all time greatest hit). King recorded a few follow-up singles in the wake of "September", but none of them sold much, and her already sporadic recording career was entirely abandoned (albeit temporarily) by 1966.

Other songs of King's early period (through 1967) include "Half Way To Paradise" [Tony Orlando, recorded by Billy Fury in U.K.], "Take Good Care of My Baby" for Bobby Vee, "Up on the Roof" for the Drifters, "I'm into Something Good" for Earl-Jean (later recorded by Herman's Hermits), "One Fine Day" for the Chiffons, and "Pleasant Valley Sunday" for the Monkees (inspired by their move to suburban West Orange, New Jersey), and "(You Make Me Feel Like) A Natural Woman" for Aretha Franklin. The duo wrote several songs recorded by Dusty Springfield, including "Goin' Back" and "Some of Your Lovin'".

By 1968, Goffin and King were divorced and were starting to lose contact. King moved to Laurel Canyon in Los Angeles with her two daughters and reactivated her recording career by forming "The City", a music trio consisting of Charles Larkey, her future husband, on bass; Danny Kortchmar on guitar and vocals; and King on piano and vocals. The City produced one album, Now That Everything's Been Said in 1968, but King's reluctance to perform live meant sales were slow. A change of distributors meant that the album was quickly deleted; the group disbanded in 1969. The album was re-discovered by Classic Rock radio in the early 1980s and the cut "Snow Queen" received nominal airplay for a few years.  Cleveland's WMMS played it every few weeks from 1981 to 1985, and the long-out-of-print LP became sought after by fans of Carole King who liked the edgy sound of the music.

1970s, Tapestry

While in Laurel Canyon, King met James Taylor and Joni Mitchell as well as Toni Stern, with whom she collaborated on songs. King made her first solo album, Writer, in 1970 for Lou Adler's Ode label, with Taylor playing acoustic guitar and providing backing vocals. It peaked at number 84 in the Billboard Top 200. The same year, King played keyboards on B.B. King's album Indianola Mississippi Seeds.

King followed Writer in 1971 with Tapestry, which featured new compositions as well as reinterpretations of  "Will You Love Me Tomorrow" and "(You Make Me Feel Like) A Natural Woman". The album was recorded concurrently with Taylor's Mud Slide Slim, with an overlapping set of musicians including King, Danny Kortchmar and Joni Mitchell. Both albums included "You've Got a Friend", which was a number 1 hit for Taylor; King said in a 1972 interview that she "didn't write it with James or anybody really specifically in mind. But when James heard it he really liked it and wanted to record it".

Tapestry was an instant success. With numerous hit singles – including a Billboard No.1 with "It's Too Late" – Tapestry held the No.1 spot for 15 consecutive weeks, remained on the charts for nearly six years, and has sold over 30 million copies worldwide. The album garnered four Grammy Awards including Album of the Year; Best Pop Vocal Performance, Female; Record of the Year ("It's Too Late", lyrics by Toni Stern); and Song of the Year, with King becoming the first woman to win the award ("You've Got a Friend"). The album appeared on Rolling Stones 500 Greatest Albums of All Time list at number 36. In addition, "It's Too Late" was number 469 on Rolling Stones 500 Greatest Songs of All Time.

Carole King: Music was released in December 1971, certified gold on December 9, 1971. It entered the top ten at 8, becoming the first of many weeks Tapestry and Carole King: Music simultaneously occupied the top 10. The following week it rose to No.3 and finally to No.1 on January 1, 1972, staying there for three weeks. The album also spawned a top 10 hit, "Sweet Seasons" (US No.9 and AC No.2). Carole King: Music stayed on the Billboard pop album charts for 44 weeks and was eventually certified platinum.

Rhymes and Reasons (1972), and Fantasy (1973) followed, each earning gold certifications. Rhymes and Reasons produced another single, "Been to Canaan" (US No.24 and AC No.1), and Fantasy produced two, "Believe in Humanity" (US No.28) and "Corazon" (US No.37 and AC No.5), as well as another song that charted on the Hot 100, "You Light Up My Life" (US No.67 and AC No.6).

In 1973, King performed a free concert in New York City's Central Park with 100,000 attending.

In September 1974, King released her album Wrap Around Joy, which was certified gold on October 16, 1974, and entered the top ten at 7 on October 19, 1974. Two weeks later it became King's third album to reach number one.  Wrap Around Joy spawned two singles, "Jazzman" and "Nightingale". "Jazzman" reached 2 on November 9 but fell out of the top ten the next week. "Nightingale" went to No. 9 on March 1, 1975.

In 1975, King scored songs for the animated TV production of Maurice Sendak's Really Rosie, released as an album by the same name, with lyrics by Sendak.

Thoroughbred (1976) was the last studio album she made under the Ode label. In addition to enlisting her long-time friends such as David Crosby, Graham Nash, James Taylor and Waddy Wachtel, King reunited with Gerry Goffin to write four songs for the album. Their partnership continued intermittently. King also did a promotional tour for the album in 1976.

After covering Carole's "Goin' Back" on October 17–18, 1975 at two of his high-profile Roxy gigs, Bruce Springsteen showed up in person at the Beacon Theatre, New York on March 7, 1976, to sing "The Loco-Motion" with Carole for the night's final encore.

In 1977, King collaborated with another songwriter, Rick Evers, on Simple Things, the first release with a new label distributed by Capitol Records. Shortly after that King and Evers were married; he died of a cocaine overdose one year later, while King and daughter Sherry were in Hawaii. Simple Things was her first album that failed to reach the top 10 on the Billboard since Tapestry, and it was her last Gold-certified record by the RIAA, except for a compilation entitled Her Greatest Hits the following year and Live at the Troubadour in 2010.

Despite its Gold-certified record status, Simple Things was named "The Worst Album of 1977" by Rolling Stone magazine. Neither Welcome Home (1978), her debut as a co-producer on an album, nor Touch the Sky (1979) reached the top 100. Pearls – The Songs of Goffin and King (1980) yielded a hit single, an updated version of "One Fine Day".

1980s

King moved to Atlantic Records for One to One (1982), and Speeding Time in 1983, which was a reunion with Tapestry-era producer Lou Adler. After a well-received concert tour in 1984, journalist Catherine Foster of The Christian Science Monitor dubbed King "a Queen of Rock". She also called King's performing "all spunk and exuberance."

In 1985, she wrote and performed "Care-A-Lot", the theme to The Care Bears Movie. Also in 1985, she scored and performed (with David Sanborn) the soundtrack to the Martin Ritt-directed movie Murphy's Romance. The soundtrack, again produced by Adler, included the songs "Running Lonely" and "Love For The Last Time (Theme from 'Murphy's Romance')", although a soundtrack album was apparently never officially released. King made a cameo appearance in the film as Tillie, a town hall employee.

In 1989, she returned to Capitol Records and recorded City Streets, with Eric Clapton on two tracks and Branford Marsalis on one, followed by Color of Your Dreams (1993), with an appearance by Slash. Her song, "Now and Forever", was in the opening credits to the 1992 movie A League of Their Own, and was nominated for a Grammy Award.

In 1988, she starred in the off-Broadway production A Minor Incident, and in 1994, she played Mrs Johnstone on Broadway in Blood Brothers. In 1996, she appeared in Brighton Beach Memoirs in Ireland, directed by Peter Sheridan.

2000s
In 2000, King was asked to record a version of her hit song "Where You Lead" as the theme song for the show Gilmore Girls. She rewrote a few lyrics to fit the mother-daughter story. She often performs this song with her daughter, Louise Goffin. She rarely performed the song after its original release due to the rise in the Women's liberation movement and falling out of favor of the sentiment behind the lyrics. King agreed to revamp the song to be, "something more relevant." The song became strongly associated with female friendships and family members.

In 2001, King appeared in a television ad for the Gap with her daughter. She performed a new song, "Love Makes the World", which became a title track for her studio album in autumn 2001 on her own label, Rockingale, distributed by Koch Records. The album includes songs she wrote for other artists during the mid-1990s and features Celine Dion, Steven Tyler, Babyface and k.d. lang. Love Makes the World went to 158 in the US and No. 86 in the UK. It also debuted on Billboard′s Top Independent Albums chart and Top Internet Albums chart at No. 20. An expanded edition of the album was issued six years later called Love Makes the World Deluxe Edition. It contains a bonus disc with five additional tracks, including a remake of "Where You Lead (I Will Follow)" co-written with Toni Stern.

The same year, King and Stern wrote "Sayonara Dance", recorded by Yuki, former lead vocalist of the Japanese band Judy and Mary, on her first solo album Prismic the following year. Also in 2001, King composed a song for All About Chemistry album by Semisonic, with the band's frontman Dan Wilson.

King launched her Living Room Tour in July 2004 at the Auditorium Theatre in Chicago. That show, along with shows at the Greek Theater in Los Angeles and the Cape Cod Melody Tent (Hyannis, Massachusetts), were recorded as The Living Room Tour in July 2005. The album sold 44,000 copies in its first week in the US, landing at 17 on the Billboard 200, her highest-charting album since 1977. The album also charted at 51 in Australia. It has sold 330,000 copies in the United States. In August 2006 the album re-entered the Billboard 200 at 151. The tour stopped in Canada, Australia and New Zealand. A DVD of the tour, called Welcome to My Living Room, was released in October 2007.

In November 2007, King toured Japan with Mary J. Blige and Fergie from the Black Eyed Peas. Japanese record labels Sony and Victor reissued most of King's albums, including the works from the late 1970s previously unavailable on compact disc. King recorded a duet of the Goffin/King composition "Time Don't Run Out on Me" with Anne Murray on Murray's 2007 album Anne Murray Duets: Friends and Legends. The song had previously been recorded by Murray for her 1984 album Heart Over Mind.

2010–present

In 2010 King and James Taylor staged their Troubadour Reunion Tour together, recalling the first time they played at The Troubadour, West Hollywood in 1970. The pair had reunited to mark the club's 50th anniversary two and a half years earlier in 2007 with the band they used in 1970. They enjoyed it so much that they decided to take the band on the road for 2010. The touring band featured players from that original band: Russ Kunkel, Leland Sklar, and Danny Kortchmar. Also present was King's son-in-law, Robbie Kondor and Taylor's three backing singers. King played piano and Taylor guitar on each other's songs, and they sang together some of the numbers they were both associated with. The tour began in Australia in March, returning to the United States in May. It was a major commercial success, with King playing to some of the largest audiences of her career. Total ticket sales exceeded 700,000 and the tour grossed over 59 million dollars, making it one of the most successful tours of the year.

During their Troubadour Reunion Tour, King released two albums, one of new material recorded with Taylor. The first, released in April 2010, The Essential Carole King, was a compilation album of King's work and artists covering her songs. The second album, Live at the Troubadour was released in May 2010, a collaboration between King and Taylor. It debuted at No.4 in the United States with sales of 78,000 copies. Live at the Troubadour has since received a gold record from the RIAA for shipments of over 500,000 copies in the US and remained on the charts for 34 weeks.

King's mother, Eugenia Gingold, died in December 2010 in Delray Beach, Florida aged 94, from congestive heart failure.

In the fall of 2011, King released A Holiday Carole, an album of Christmas music and new songs written by her daughter Louise Goffin who co-produced the album.  The album received a Grammy nomination for Best Traditional Pop Album.

King's autobiography, A Natural Woman: A Memoir was published by Grand Central in the United States in April 2012. It entered The New York Times best seller list at No.6.

In May 2012, King announced her retirement from music. King herself doubted she would ever write another song and said that her 2010 Troubadour Reunion Tour with James Taylor was probably the last tour of her life, saying that it "was a good way to go out." King also said she will most likely not be writing or recording any new music. Later that month she wrote on her Facebook page that she never said she was actually retiring and insisted that she was taking a break. Carole campaigned for Idahoan Nicole LeFavour and Barack Obama in 2012.

Early in December 2012, King received a star on the Hollywood Walk of Fame. In 2012 she was given the benefit concert 'Painted Turtle – a celebration of Carole King'. King also did an Australian tour in February 2013. Following the Boston Marathon bombing, she performed in Boston with James Taylor to help victims of the bombing.

In late 2012, the Library of Congress announced that King had been named the 2013 recipient of the Gershwin Prize for Popular Song – the first woman to receive the distinction, given to songwriters for a body of work. President Barack Obama and Michelle Obama hosted the award concert at the White House on May 22, 2013, with the President presenting the prize and reading the citation. In May 2013 Carole King received an Honorary Doctorate of Music from Berklee College of Music. In June 2013 she campaigned in Massachusetts for US Representative Ed Markey, the Democratic nominee in a special election for the US Senate to succeed John Kerry who had resigned to become Secretary of State.

King was honored as MusiCares Person of the Year in January 2014. 
On December 6, 2015, she was honored as a Kennedy Center Honoree.

In 2016, King was the headline performer at the British Summer Time Festival held in Hyde Park, London on July 3, 2016, playing all of Tapestry live for the first time. An album of the concert was released in 2017.

In October 2018, King released a new version of her song, "One". In her first new recording since 2011, she was inspired to re-write the lyrics to her song "One" (originally on her 1977 album Simple Things) as "One (2018)" to reflect her dream for America in the 2018 United States elections, as "Love won".

Acting roles
King has appeared occasionally in acting roles. One of her earliest was in 1975, when she was the speaking and singing voice of the title character in Really Rosie, an animated TV special based on the works of Maurice Sendak. Also in 1975, she appeared (credited under her married name, Carole Larkey) on The Mary Tyler Moore Show in the episode "Anyone Who Hates Kids and Dogs".  In 1984, she starred alongside Tatum O'Neal, Hoyt Axton, Alex Karras, and John Lithgow in the Faerie Tale Theatre episode Goldilocks and the Three Bears. She later made three appearances as guest star on the TV series Gilmore Girls as Sophie, the owner of the Stars Hollow music store. King's song "Where You Lead (I Will Follow)" was also the theme song to the series, in a version sung with her daughter Louise. She reprised the role in the 2016 Gilmore girls Netflix revival, Gilmore Girls: A Year in the Life. King also appeared as Mrs. Johnstone as a replacement in the original Broadway production of Blood Brothers.

Personal life and family
King has been married four times, to Gerry Goffin, Charles Larkey, Rick Evers, and Rick Sorenson. In her 2012 memoir, King wrote that she had been physically abused by her third husband, Rick Evers, on a regular basis. Evers died of a cocaine overdose days after they separated in 1978.

Her children are musicians Louise Goffin and Sherry Goffin Kondor, artist Molly Larkey and Levi Larkey.

, King lives in Idaho.

Political and environmental activism
After relocating to Idaho in 1977, King became involved in environmental issues. Since 1990, she has been working with the Alliance for the Wild Rockies and other groups towards passage of the Northern Rockies Ecosystem Protection Act (NREPA). King has testified on Capitol Hill three times on behalf of NREPA: in 1994, 2007 and again in 2009.

King is also politically active in the United States Democratic Party. In 2003, she began campaigning for John Kerry, performing in private homes for caucus delegates during the Democratic primaries. On July 29, 2004, she made a short speech and sang at the Democratic National Convention, about two hours before Kerry made his acceptance speech for the Democratic nomination for president. King continued her support of Kerry throughout the general election.  When Kerry was named Secretary of State in 2013 she campaigned with US Representative Ed Markey, the Democratic nominee to succeed Kerry in a special election.

In 2008, King appeared on the March 18 episode of The Colbert Report, touching on her politics again. She said she was supporting Hillary Clinton, and said the choice had nothing to do with gender. She also said she would have no issues if Barack Obama won the election. Before the show's conclusion, she returned to the stage to perform "I Feel the Earth Move".

On October 6, 2014, she performed at a Democratic fundraiser at the Beverly Wilshire Hotel in Beverly Hills, California, attended by Vice President Joe Biden.

On January 21, 2017, King marched in the 2017 Women's March in Stanley, Idaho, carrying a sign that said "One Small Voice."  In an op-ed for The Huffington Post, she wrote she carried that message because "I've never stopped believing that one small voice plus millions of other small voices is exactly how we change the world."

Legacy

An all-star roster of artists paid tribute to King on the 1995 album Tapestry Revisited: A Tribute to Carole King. From the album, Rod Stewart's version of "So Far Away" and Celine Dion's recording of "A Natural Woman" were both Adult Contemporary chart hits. Other artists who appeared on the album included Amy Grant ("It's Too Late"), Richard Marx ("Beautiful"), Aretha Franklin ("You've Got a Friend"), Faith Hill ("Where You Lead"), and the Bee Gees ("Will You Love Me Tomorrow?").

Former Monkee Micky Dolenz released King for a Day, a tribute album consisting of songs written or co-written by King, in 2010. The album includes "Sometime in the Morning", a King-penned song originally recorded by the Monkees in 1967. Dolenz had previously recorded another of King's Monkees compositions, "Porpoise Song", on his lullaby-themed CD Micky Dolenz Puts You to Sleep.

Many other cover versions of King's work have appeared over the years. Among the most notable are:
 "You've Got a Friend" was a No. 1 hit for James Taylor in 1971 and a Top 40 hit for Roberta Flack and Donny Hathaway that same year.
 Barbra Streisand had a top 40 hit in 1972 with "Where You Lead" twice – by itself and as part of a live medley with "Sweet Inspiration".
 Helen Reddy covered two Carole King penned tunes: the first was "No Sad Song" in 1971 (number 62); the second was "I Can't Hear You No More" in 1976, combined with "Music Is My Life" to reach number 29.
 The Carpenters recorded King's "It's Going to Take Some Time" in 1972, and reached number 12 on the Billboard charts.
 Martika had a number 25 hit in 1989 with her version of "I Feel the Earth Move".
 "It's Too Late" reappeared on the Adult Contemporary chart in 1995 by Gloria Estefan.
 Linda Ronstadt recorded a new version of "Oh No Not My Baby" in 1993, reaching number 35 on the AC Chart the next year. 
 Celine Dion recorded King's song "The Reason" on her 1997 album Let's Talk About Love with Carole King singing backup. The remake was certified Diamond in France.
 "Where You Lead" (lyrics by Toni Stern), re-recorded to include King's daughter, became the title song of TV show Gilmore Girls.
 The Crusaders had an instrumental hit with "So Far Away", rising to number 39 in 1972 on the AC Chart.
 "Locomotion" was recorded by Kylie Minogue, having success and starting off a long career in the music industry.

Film biography

In 1996, a film very loosely based on King's life, Grace of My Heart, was written and directed by Allison Anders. In the film, an aspiring singer sacrifices her own singing career to write hit songs that launch the careers of other singers. Mirroring King's life, the film follows her from her first break, through the pain of rejection from the recording industry and a bad marriage, to her final triumph in realizing her dream to record her own hit album.

The story includes material and characters loosely based on King's songwriting colleagues, as well as the singers for whom they wrote their material, and various producers involved in the creative environment that existed at the Brill Building from 1958 to 1964 and in the California music scene from 1965 to 1971.

Broadway musical biography

A musical version of King's life and career debuted in pre-Broadway tryouts in September 2013, in San Francisco, titled Beautiful: The Carole King Musical. It starred Jessie Mueller in the title role. Previews on Broadway began on November 21, 2013, at the Stephen Sondheim Theatre, with the official opening on January 12, 2014. The book is by Douglas McGrath. Reviews were mixed, but generally warm. Jessie Mueller won the Tony Award for Best Performance by an Actress in a Leading Role in a Musical for her portrayal of King, and Brian Ronan won the Tony Award for Best Sound Design of a Musical.
The show ran for 6 years and 2418 performances on Broadway.

Awards

Golden Globe Awards

Grammy Awards

|-
| rowspan="4" | 1972
| Tapestry
| Album of the Year
| 
|-
| "It's Too Late"
| Record of the Year
| 
|-
| "You've Got A Friend"
| Song of the Year
| 
|-
| Tapestry
| rowspan="2" | Best Female Pop Vocal Performance
| 
|-
| 1975
|  "Jazzman"
| 
|-
| 1976
| Really Rosie
| Best Album for Children
| 
|-
| 1993
| "Now and Forever"
| Best Song Written Specifically for a Motion Picture or Television
| 
|-
| 1998
| Tapestry
| rowspan="3" | Grammy Hall of Fame
| 
|-
| 2002
| "You've Got a Friend"
| 
|-
| 2002
| "It's Too Late"
| 
|-
| 2004
| Carole King
| Grammy Trustees Award
| 
|-
| rowspan="2" | 2013
| Lifetime Achievement
| Grammy Lifetime Achievement Award
| 
|-
| A Holiday Carole
| Best Traditional Pop Vocal Album
| 
|-
| 2014
| Carole King
| MusiCares Person of the Year
| 
|-
| 2022
| "Here I Am (Singing My Way Home)" (with Jennifer Hudson and Jamie Hartman)
| Best Song Written for Visual Media
| 
|}

Primetime Emmy Awards

|-
| 2000
| "Song of Freedom"
| Outstanding Music and Lyrics
| 
|}

Satellite Awards

|-
| 1998
| "Anyone At All"
| Best Original Song
| 
|}

Recognition
 In 1987, Goffin and King were inducted into the Songwriters Hall of Fame.
 In 1988, Goffin and King received the National Academy of Songwriters Lifetime Achievement Award.
 In 1990, King was inducted, along with Goffin, into the Rock and Roll Hall of Fame in the non-performer category for her songwriting achievements.
 In 2002, King was given the "Johnny Mercer Award" by the Songwriters Hall of Fame.
 In 2004, Goffin and King were awarded the Grammy Trustees Award.
 King was inducted into the Long Island Music Hall of Fame in 2007.
 In 2012 (December 3), King received the 2,486th star on the Hollywood Walk of Fame.
 On February 9, 2013, King was awarded the Grammy Lifetime Achievement Award.
 On Tuesday, May 21, 2013, the Library of Congress hosted an invitation-only concert at their Coolidge Auditorium in honor of Carole King.  The all-star tribute included performances by Siedah Garrett, Colbie Caillat, Gian Marco, Shelby Lynne, Patti Austin, Arturo Sandoval and King's daughter, Louise Goffin.
 On the following night, May 22, 2013, at the White House, King was joined by other star performers including James Taylor, Gloria Estefan, Emeli Sandé, Trisha Yearwood, Jesse McCartney and Billy Joel. President Barack Obama presented Carole King with the fifth Library of Congress Gershwin Prize for Popular Song, the first awarded to a woman composer. The White House concert and awards ceremony capped off two days of events celebrating Carole King.
 In 2014, King received the Golden Plate Award of the American Academy of Achievement.
On December 6, 2015, she was honored at the Kennedy Center Honors for her lifetime contribution to American culture through the performing arts.
In 2021, King was inducted into the Rock and Roll Hall of Fame as a solo artist.

Discography

 1970: Writer
 1971: Tapestry
 1971: Music
 1972: Rhymes & Reasons
 1973: Fantasy
 1974: Wrap Around Joy
 1975: Really Rosie (soundtrack)
 1976: Thoroughbred
 1977: Simple Things
 1978: Her Greatest Hits: Songs of Long Ago (compilation)
 1978: Welcome Home
 1979: Touch the Sky
 1980: Pearls: Songs of Goffin and King
 1982: One to One
 1983: Speeding Time
 1989: City Streets
 1993: Colour of Your Dreams
 1996: The Carnegie Hall Concert: June 18, 1971
 2001: Love Makes the World
 2005: The Living Room Tour
 2011: A Holiday Carole
 2012: The Legendary Demos (compilation)

Filmography

Certifications
The years given are the years the albums and singles were released, and not necessarily the years in which they achieved their peak.

U.S. Billboard Top 10 Albums
 1971 – Tapestry (No.1)
 1971 – Music (No.1)
 1972 – Rhymes & Reasons (No.2)
 1973 – Fantasy (No.6)
 1974 – Wrap Around Joy (No.1)
 1976 – Thoroughbred (No.3)
 2010 – Live at the Troubadour (with James Taylor) (No.4)

U.S. Billboard Top 10 'Pop' Singles
 1971 – "It's Too Late" / "I Feel the Earth Move" (No.1)
 1971 – "Sweet Seasons" (No.9)
 1974 – "Jazzman" (No.2)
 1974 – "Nightingale" (No.9)

Albums and singles certifications

See also
Hits, charted songs and notable album tracks by Goffin and King
 List of songwriter collaborations

References

External links

 
 
Carole King On A&M Records
 
 
 

 
1942 births
Living people
20th-century American actresses
20th-century American keyboardists
20th-century American women pianists
20th-century American pianists
20th-century American women singers
21st-century American actresses
21st-century American keyboardists
21st-century American women pianists
21st-century American pianists
21st-century American women singers
A&M Records artists
Actresses from New York City
American women environmentalists
American conservationists
American women pop singers
American women rock singers
American women singer-songwriters
American film actresses
American pop pianists
American session musicians
American soft rock musicians
American television actresses
American voice actresses
Ballad musicians
MNRK Music Group artists
Epic Records artists
Gershwin Prize recipients
Grammy Lifetime Achievement Award winners
James Madison High School (Brooklyn) alumni
Jewish American songwriters
Jewish folk singers
Kennedy Center honorees
Musicians from Brooklyn
New Jersey Democrats
New York (state) Democrats
Ode Records artists
People from Manhattan
People from West Orange, New Jersey
Pop pianists
Priority Records artists
Queens College, City University of New York alumni
RCA Records artists
Singer-songwriters from New Jersey
Singers from New York City
Singer-songwriters from New York (state)
20th-century American singers
21st-century American singers
People from Laurel Canyon, Los Angeles